Arianne Phosphate is a  mining company located in Quebec developing its Lac à Paul project,  one of the largest phosphates reserve in Canada. having estimated reserves of 590 million tonnes of ore grading 7.13% P2O5. Arianne Phosphate Inc. is listed on the TSX Venture Exchange under the symbol "DAN".

Location 

The Lac à Paul project is located north of the 49th parallel (an area covered by the Plan Nord), north of Saguenay-Lac-Saint-Jean region.

References 

Phosphate mines in Canada